"A Rock Star Bucks a Coffee Shop" is a song recorded by Neil Young and Promise of the Real. It is a protest song aimed at the companies: Starbucks and Monsanto. The piece comes from the concept album The Monsanto Years, which primarily criticizes the firm Monsanto.

About the Song

The song was released as a single in May 2015 and is the first song on the album The Monsanto Years.

It refers to the lawsuit by Monsanto against Vermont due to the state's attempt at passing a GMO labeling law. The song also references "the poison tide of Monsanto" and a farmer who signs a GMO deal when Young sings, "I want a cup of coffee but I don't want a GMO. I'd like to start my day off without helping Monsanto."

In a brief review of the song, Stefan Schmidt in The National Singles Round-Up also remarked that song did not hold back against critiquing Starbucks and Monsanto and suggested that Young hadn't lost his appetite for tackling political issues.

As of the 31st of May 2015, the song was also rewarded with the title "Video of the Week" on the Food Consumer website.

Venue 
Young also introduced an acoustic version of the song in Maui while performing at "OUTGROW Monsanto", a festival held to protest Monsanto's business practices in Hawaii.

Moreover, the song was also featured in Young's July and October 2015 tours, for which Promise of the Real served as his backing band.

References

Songs about musicians
Songs against capitalism
2015 songs
Anti-GMO movement
Neil Young songs
Protest songs
Songs written by Neil Young
Song recordings produced by Neil Young
Starbucks in popular culture